Kinetica is a PlayStation 2 video game.

Kinetica may also refer to:

 Kinetica (game engine), a game engine first used in the Kinetica video game
 Kinetica (software), an American software company
 Kinetica Sports Ltd, an Irish sports nutrition company
 Kinetica, former name for the Australian National Bibliographic Database